G. P. Mathur was an Indian civil servant and administrator. He was the administrator of Mahe from 2 July 1957 to 7 November 1958.

References 

 

Year of birth missing
Possibly living people
Administrators of Mahe